Bandar Baharu is a state constituency in Kedah, Malaysia, that is represented in the Kedah State Legislative Assembly.

The ethnic demographics of this state constituency is 79.15% Malay, 13.74% Chinese, 6.92% Indian and 0.18% Others

Demographics

History

Polling districts 
According to the gazette issued on 30 March 2018, the Bandar Baharu constituency has a total of 18 polling districts.

Representation history

Election results

References 

Kedah state constituencies